Catholic music may refer to: 

Gregorian chant
Contemporary Catholic liturgical music
List of Catholic musicians